The canton of Cuiseaux is an administrative division of the Saône-et-Loire department, eastern France. Its borders were modified at the French canton reorganisation which came into effect in March 2015. Its seat is in Cuiseaux.

It consists of the following communes:
 
L'Abergement-de-Cuisery
Bantanges
Brienne
Champagnat
La Chapelle-Thècle
Condal
Cuiseaux
Cuisery
Dommartin-lès-Cuiseaux
Flacey-en-Bresse
La Frette
Frontenaud
La Genête
Huilly-sur-Seille
Joudes
Jouvençon
Loisy
Ménetreuil
Le Miroir
Montpont-en-Bresse
Ormes
Rancy
Ratenelle
Romenay
Sainte-Croix-en-Bresse
Savigny-sur-Seille
Simandre
Varennes-Saint-Sauveur

References

Cantons of Saône-et-Loire